Banjup is a suburb of Perth, Western Australia, located within the City of Cockburn. Its postcode is 6164.

The suburb has  a mixture of small scale rural properties which have been used for hobby farms (for example to run horses) and "lifestyle" residents who prefer open space and more space when compared to normal Perth suburban blocks.

Banjup is located on the Jandakot Water Mound.  As part of the Western Australian State Government water resource protection policy development over the Jandakot Water Mound is limited to reduce the possibility of contamination from runoff from properties.  As a consequence the number of animals per property is limited by the City of Cockburn zoning policies (for example 1 horse per 2 ha property - exemptions apply for established properties with livestock).

Much of the Jandakot Regional Park is located within Banjup.

History 
Banjup was named in the mid-1950s from the lake in the district.  During the survey of the Jandakot Agricultural Area in 1889, surveyor James Oxley recorded the name of Lake Bangup.  A siding on the Fremantle-Armadale railway line was named Banjupp in 1907 and this name was altered to Banjup in the 1930s.

In 2016, the northern portion of Banjup (extending above Armadale Road) was turned into a new suburb, named Treeby.

Banjup Memorial Park 
Banjup Memorial Park was established after World War I. A gum tree was planted for each of the fourteen men from the district who had enlisted. If any of the trees dies, another is planted in its place. A plaque naming the men is displayed at the park and another is held at the Azelia Ley Homestead.  The plaque names the men who returned safely as well as those who were wounded or killed. Cockburn RSL maintains Banjup Memorial Park.

Of the 14 Banjup men who served in the war, six were killed in action, four were wounded and the remaining four returned to Australia.  This memorial records the highest "Killed in Action" and "Wounded" on a percentage basis, than any other war memorial in Western Australia.

Community group 
The Banjup Residents Group was established in 2010 to advocate on behalf of Banjup residents to local, state and federal governments.  Approximately 45% of Banjup residents are members.

References

External links

Suburbs of Perth, Western Australia
Suburbs in the City of Cockburn